Comedy Bar is a Philippine television variety show broadcast by GMA Network. Hosted by Eugene Domingo and Allan K., it premiered on April 24, 2010 replacing Cool Center. The show concluded on October 29, 2011 with a total of 77 episodes. It was replaced by Just for Laughs: Gags in its timeslot.

Hosts

 Eugene Domingo
 Allan K.

Co-hosts
 Tomas Gonzales
 Fabio Ide
 Boobay
 Ate Gay

Band
 Six Feet Long

Guest hosts
 Rufa Mae Quinto
 Carmina Villaroel

Chronology

Launching and Airing (April – December 2010)
The show was announced by GMA management thru the network's showbiz program Showbiz Central shortly after the cancellation of BandaOke (Allan's previous weekly show for his hosting stint).  The original working title of the new comedy show was "Laf Kita!" but it was later renamed as "Comedy Bar".

Traveling in Abroad (December 2010 – January 2011)
The whole staff of the show travelled to Dubai for the World Tour but it aired between Christmas (December 25, 2010) and New Year (January 1, 2011) It featured Tomas with his solo travel to Morocco.

Changes (January 2011 – October 2011)
The whole year 2011 was crucial for the show due to the death of one of its mainstays, Tomas Gonzales died last March 21, 2011 due to heart attack.  On July–August 2011 the commemorate the 1st Anniversary of the show in Zirkoh Bar Tomas Morato (which organized by Allan K [one of the hosts]) 
then they recently reformatted the logo and launched stand-up comedian "Boobsie" as their new co-host. the final episode was aired last October 29, 2011.

Ratings
According to AGB Nielsen Philippines' Mega Manila household television ratings, the pilot episode of Comedy Bar earned a 10.3% rating. While the final episode scored a 2.7% rating.

Accolades

References

External links
 

2010 Philippine television series debuts
2011 Philippine television series endings
Filipino-language television shows
GMA Network original programming
Philippine variety television shows